Cry Club is a queer pop-punk duo from Melbourne, Australia, who formed as a group in 2018. They released their debut album God I'm Such a Mess in November 2020.

Biography

The duo was formed in Wollongong in 2018, when vocalist Heather Riley wanted to form a Siouxsie and the Banshees/The Cure cover band. Riley had known Jono Tooke since 2014, when they met during a university-organised trip to Japan and bonded over the animated series Over the Garden Wall.

The band's debut single, released in 2018, was a response to the 2017 same-sex marriage plebiscite in Australia, inspired by conversations with relatives who accepted and loved them as family members, but were adamantly voting against same-sex marriage. The group's follow-up  single "DFTM", a song about people not respecting physical boundaries at concerts, was added to full rotation at Triple J in April 2019, and the duo became the most played act on Triple J Unearthed in 2019. The band relocated to Melbourne, and in 2019 released their debut extended play Sad, But Make It Fashion.

The duo released their debut album God I'm Such a Mess in November 2020. The album was nominated for Best Independent Punk Album or EP at the AIR Awards of 2021, and the band was nominated for best breakthrough act at the 2021 Music Victoria Awards.

Personal lives 

The members of the band identify as queer. Riley identifies as non-binary, and uses they/them pronouns.

Discography

Studio albums

Extended plays

Singles

Awards and nominations

AIR Awards
The Australian Independent Record Awards (commonly known informally as AIR Awards) is an annual awards night to recognise, promote and celebrate the success of Australia's Independent Music sector.

! 
|-
|2021
|God I'm Such a Mess
|Best Independent Punk Album or EP
|
|
|-

Music Victoria Awards
The Music Victoria Awards, are an annual awards night celebrating Victorian music. They commenced in 2005.

! 
|-
| 2021
| Cry Club
| Best Breakthrough Act
| 
| 
|-

References

External links
 

2018 establishments in Australia
Australian pop punk groups
Musical groups established in 2018
Musical groups from Melbourne
People from Wollongong
Queer musicians